Upton and Blewbury railway station was a station on the Didcot, Newbury and Southampton Railway in England. It served Upton, with Blewbury and West Hagbourne being only a mile from the station. It was opened in 1882 to serve military camps in the area. Originally named Upton; Blewbury was added to the name of the station in 1911 to recognise the more distant but larger village in the Vale of White Horse. In the latter part of the station's history it also served the Atomic Energy Research Establishment at Harwell. The station closed in 1962.

Facilities
The station comprised two platforms, with the ticket office and station buildings located on the southbound platform on a passing loop. The northbound platform, linked by two paths across the tracks at either end for access, had a small wooden shelter and a signal box at its northern end. To the North of the station was a headshunt and two sidings, one flanking the southbound platform used for loading horses and other goods, the other siding curving to the east.

The site today
The station building is still in excellent condition with a recent extension in the original style. It even retains its original canopy, although it has also been recently surrounded by further housing. The original station approach and car park area has been named "Beeching Close".

Routes

References

Disused railway stations in Oxfordshire
Former Great Western Railway stations
Railway stations in Great Britain opened in 1882
Railway stations in Great Britain closed in 1942
Railway stations in Canada opened in 1943
Railway stations in Great Britain closed in 1962